Lefkada (Lefkáda), also known as Lefkas or Leukas (Ancient Greek and Katharevousa: Λευκάς, Leukás, modern pronunciation Lefkás) and Leucadia, is a Greek island in the Ionian Sea on the west coast of Greece, connected to the mainland by a long causeway and floating bridge. The principal town of the island and seat of the municipality is Lefkada. It is situated on the northern part of the island, approximately 25 minutes by automobile away from Aktion National Airport. The island is part of the regional unit of Lefkada.

Geography

The east coast section of the island has small resorts of Lygia, Nikiana and Perigiali, all north of Nidri, the largest resort on the island. It is set in a sheltered location with views across to Skorpios (formerly owned by Aristotle Onassis), Meganisi and other small islands, as well as the Greek mainland. The main coastal road from Lefkada to Vasiliki runs through the village, although a bypass has now been completed which skirts the village to the west. There are regular car ferries to Kefalonia, Ithaca and Meganissi.

 south of Nidri is the resort of Vasiliki, a windsurfing center. There are ferries to Kefalonia and Ithaca from Vasiliki. South of Vasiliki is Cape Lefkada, where the Greek female poet Sappho allegedly leapt to her death from the 30 m high cliffs.

The famous beach of Porto Katsiki is located on Lefkada's west coast.  Lefkada was attached to mainland Greece (see below about Homer's Ithaca being Lefkada). The Corinthians dug a trench in the 7th century BC on its isthmus.

The southernmost tip of the island is called Cape Dukato, a name sometimes applied to the whole island.

Climate

The island has a typical Mediterranean climate: hot summers and cool winters, especially in the mountains.

History

Antiquity
The stories of Sappho's suicide and that of Artemisia of Caria jumping from the cliffs at Cape Lefkada are related to other myths linking the island to the ancient Greek goddess of love, Aphrodite. The island is also linked to Odysseus, the hero of Homer's Odyssey. The German archaeologist Wilhelm Dörpfeld, having performed excavations at various locations of Lefkada,  was able to obtain funding to do work on the island by suggesting that Lefkada was Homer's Ithaca, and the palace of Odysseus was located west of Nydri on the south coast of Lefkada. There have been suggestions by local tourism officials that several passages in the Odyssey point to Lefkada as a possible model for Homeric Ithaca. The most notable of these passages pushed by the local tourism board describes Ithaca as an island reachable on foot, which was the case for Lefkada since it is not really an island, being connected to the mainland by a narrow causeway. According to Strabo, the coast of Acarnania was called Leucas in earlier times. The ancient sources call Leucas a Corinthian colony, perhaps with a Corcyraen participation. In medieval British legend, Brutus of Troy found Lefkada abandoned after pirate attacks, and after offering a sacrifice to a statue of Diana in the temple of a ruined city there, was granted a vision telling him to go to Britain and found an empire.

The ancient town was founded in the 7th century BC, somewhat to the south of the modern capital of the island. During the Peloponnesian War, Leucas joined the Peloponnesian League.

The town was conquered during the 3rd century by Agathocles of Syracuse.

Middle Ages

Byzantine period
No information survives on the island during the early Byzantine period, when the town possibly disappeared in the turmoils of the Migration Period. Nevertheless, unlike the Epirote mainland, where widespread Slavic settlement is attested from the late 6th until mid-8th centuries, only a handful of traces attest to a Slavic settlement in Lefkada.

Information continues to be sparse during the middle Byzantine period. The island is attested as a bishopric at the Fourth Council of Constantinople in 879, and was raised to archbishopric under Emperor Leo VI the Wise. Administratively, it was likely part of the Theme of Cephallenia. Liutprand of Cremona visited the island during his 968 embassy to Constantinople. In 1099 it was raided by Dagobert of Pisa, and it is mentioned in al-Idrisi's geography in the mid-12th century.

Epirote and Latin rule

The Republic of Venice was accorded privileges in the island in 1198 and possession of the island in the treaty of partition of the Byzantine Empire in 1204. Lefkada apparently became part of the Despotate of Epirus, although this is not explicitly attested until 1259.

The name Santa Maura is first attested for the island and its capital in 1292, when Genoese ships in Byzantine employ raided it. In 1295, the Despot of Epirus Nikephoros I Komnenos Doukas ceded the island to his son-in-law, the Count palatine of Cephalonia and Zakynthos John I Orsini. Orsini soon after received permission from Charles II of Naples to build a castle there, which became the core of the Castle of Santa Maura.

The Orsini family lost Lefkada in 1331 to Walter VI of Brienne, who in 1343 ceded the castrum Sancte Maure and the island to the Venetian Graziano Giorgio. In 1360/62, Leonardo I Tocco seized Lefkada, assuming the title of duke (dux Lucate), whence the island is sometimes also referred to as "the Duchy" (el Ducato and variants thereof) in Western sources of the period. The local Orthodox archbishop was evicted. After Albanian clans took over much of Epirus in the 1350s and 1360s, they launched frequent attacks on the island between 1375 and 1395. Carlo I Tocco made the island the capital of his domains, which apart from the County palatine of Cephalonia and Zakynthos also included much of the Epirote mainland, and enlarged the fortified town.

In 1413, the Prince of Achaea, Centurione II Zaccaria, launched an attack on Lefkada and its castle with Albanian mercenaries, but were defeated with help from the Republic of Venice. The Ottomans captured most of Epirus and raided the island, leading the Tocci to consider ceding it to the Venetians. 

Faced with expanding Ottoman power in the mainland, the Tocci became vassals of the Ottoman sultans. The last of them, Leonardo III Tocco was helped to maintain his rule through his marriage to Milica Branković, a niece of the highly esteemed stepmother of the Ottoman sultan Mehmed the Conqueror; but when she died, he married the Aragonese Francesca Marzano. The couple quickly became hated by their Greek subjects due to their oppressive taxation. Lefkada, along with Cephalonia and Zakynthos, was captured by the Ottoman admiral Gedik Ahmed Pasha in 1479. Part of the population was deported to Constantinople as part of Mehmed's 
policy to repopulate his capital.

Ottoman period

The Ottomans called the island Levkada ( or ), with the name Aya Mavra (from Greek , meaning "Santa Maura") reserved for the castle and capital of the island, where almost the entire population lived. Under Ottoman rule, it was initially a kaza of the sanjak of Karli-Eli, which from  belonged to the Eyalet of the Archipelago, subordinated to the chief admiral of the Ottoman navy, the Kapudan Pasha. The kaza of Lefkada comprised not only the island, but also part of the adjoining mainland. The Venetians briefly occupied the island in 1502–03 during the Second Ottoman–Venetian War, but returned it to the Ottomans in the final peace settlement. As with the rest of the sanjak, at the time the entire population appears to have been Christian, and only the fortress garrisons and administrators were Muslim; thus the only mosques were located inside the fortresses.

Bringing water to the walled town as well as to the much larger—some 700–800 houses—open town that had grown around it was one of the most important works of Ottoman civil architecture in the western Balkans. On top of the aqueduct was a footpath that provided the only access to the island other than by the sea. In the aftermath of the Ottoman defeat at the Battle of Lepanto, the castle was unsuccessfully besieged by the forces of the Holy League. As a result, it was completely rebuilt and enlarged by the Kapudan Pasha Kılıç Ali Pasha in 1572–1574 into a hexagonal fortress with large towers as artillery platforms. 

In the 17th century, Lefkada became a separate sanjak within the Eyalet of the Archipelago, although according to Evliya Çelebi it belonged briefly to the Morea Eyalet in the 15th and 17th centuries. Evliya visited the island in 1670/71 and left a long and accurate description of the fortifications as well as of the town, where Islam had apparently made considerable progress. According to Evliya, the walled town boasted five Friday mosques, including an Imperial Mosque (Hünkar Camii), which was a converted church, a minor mosque (masjid), a madrasa, two schools (maktab), a bath (hammam), and five public fountains (çeshme). The walled town with its 200 stone houses was now occupied exclusively by Muslims, while the two suburbs (varosh) to the east and west were built of wood and had a mixed population. The western one was far larger, with 300 houses to 40–50 in the eastern one, and had a wooden mosque and masjid, a tekke, a maktab, two caravanserais, as well as seven small churches. Evliya remarks that this suburb had many wineshops, which were popular with both the inhabitants and the garrison. Another suburb (the Varosh-i Lefqada) was located on the island itself, with some 700 houses, all of them inhabited by Christian Greeks, who had 20 churches. Evliya's account is corroborated by Jacob Spon and George Wheler's account that the town had about 5,000 to 6,000 inhabitants, mostly Greeks or Turks.

According to the descriptions of travellers like Evliya, Lefkada was an urban centre of some importance, boasting "two of the largest works of Ottoman civil and military architecture in the Western Balkans", namely the aqueduct built by Sultan Suleiman the Magnificent and the Castle of Santa Maura, which was completely rebuilt by Kılıç Ali Pasha in the reign of Sultan Selim II.

Venetian period

The island was conquered by the Venetians under Francesco Morosini following a sixteen-day siege in 1684, during the opening stages of the Morean War. Morosini evacuated the walled town and demolished both it and the two suburbs directly outside the walls, turning them into the castle's glacis. Only the island suburb remained, known as "Amaxiki" until the 19th century. With the evicted inhabitants settling there, this became the main town of the island, the predecessor of the modern city of Lefkada. The Venetians also removed all buildings associated with Islam.

The Venetians modernized the castle in the 1710s, removing the last traces of the medieval castle and adding outworks towards the eastern, mainland side. During the Seventh Ottoman–Venetian War, following the Ottoman reconquest of the Morea in 1715, the Venetians initially abandoned Lefkada to focus their resources on the defence of Corfu. The castle was abandoned and partly demolished, but after the Siege of Corfu ended in a Venetian victory, the island was reoccupied and the fortifications restored.

Venetian rule over the island was uninterrupted, apart from a rebellion of the local Greeks in 1769, until the Fall of the Republic of Venice in 1797.

Post-Venetian period until the union with Greece
Following the end of the Republic of Venice in 1797, Lefkada, like the other Venetian Ionian Islands, was occupied by the French, who held it until a Russo-Turkish expedition under Fyodor Ushakov captured it in 1799. In 1800, the Septinsular Republic was established, a Russian protectorate under de jure Ottoman suzerainty. The Russian Empire employed troops recruited from fugitive klephts and armatoloi in the Ionian Islands, particularly of Lefkada. Among these were captains Anastasios Tselios and Apostolos Levendakis, the latter of whom in 1802 offered to raise a company of 60 fighters on Lefkada to support the Russians. Ali Pasha of Ioannina, who coveted possession of the Ionian Islands, besieged Lefkada in 1807. For this purpose he erected two forts on the mainland shore, the Tekke Castle and the St. George's Castle, but his attacks on the Castle of Santa Maura were successfully repulsed by the local Russian and Greek forces of the Septinsular Republic. French rule was restored in 1807 after the Treaty of Tilsit, but in 1810, the British captured the island. In 1815, the United Kingdom set up the United States of the Ionian Islands as a protectorate, including Lefkada. 

Much of the town, including the Ottoman aqueduct, was destroyed in an earthquake in 1825. After this, the town was rebuilt in wood to prevent similar damage. In 1864 the islands were ceded to Greece. The island then numbered about 24,000 inhabitants.

Lafcadio Hearn Historical Center
The first museum in Europe for Lafcadio Hearn, who was born on the island and is named after it, was inaugurated in Lefkada on July 4, 2014, as Lafcadio Hearn Historical Center. It contains early editions, rare books and Japanese collectibles. The visitors, through photos, texts and exhibits, can wander in the significant events of Lafcadio Hearn's life, and also in the civilizations of Europe, America and Japan of late 19th and early 20th centuries through the open mind of his lectures, writings and tales. The municipalities of Kumamoto, Matsue, Shinjuku, Yaizu, as well as Toyama University, the Koizumi family, and other people from Japan and Greece contributed to the establishment of the Lafcadio Hearn Historical Center.

Municipality
The present municipality of Lefkada was formed in the 2011 local government reform by the merger of the following 7 former municipalities, which became municipal units:
Apollonioi
Ellomenos
Kalamos
Karya
Kastos
Lefkada (city)
Sfakiotes

The municipality covers the island of Lefkada and the smaller islands of  Kastos and Kalamos.

Education
Regional Development department, part of Ionian university based in Lefkada.

Transport
Greek National Road 42
Aktion (Preveza) Airport

Notable people

(in chronological order)

Marcos Christino Fioravanti (1775–1862), co-founder of Santo Antônio da Patrulha in Brazil 
Frederick Temple (1821–1902), Archbishop of Canterbury
Aristotelis Valaoritis (1824–1879), poet and politician
Lafcadio Hearn (1850–1904), Greco-Irish orientalist and writer, named after the island
Petros Soumilas (1861–1955), Greek Army officer who reached the rank of lieutenant general.
Dimitrios Golemis (1874–1941), athlete
Grigorios Karydis (1912–1968), musician, opera composer and professor of philharmonic orchestra 
Aggelos Sikelianos (1884–1951), poet and playwright
Tzavalas Karousos or Karoussos (1904–1969), actor
Aristotle Onassis, (1906–1975), Greek shipping tycoon
Panos Rontoyannis (1911–1996), philologist and historian
Theodoros Stamos (1922–1997), Greek-American painter
Apostolos Kaklamanis (1936-), politician
Evaggelos Vlassopoulos (1935–2002), politician
George Ktenas (1938-2004), politician
Gerasimos Caclamanes (1940-2003) mathematician and author
Agnes Baltsa (1944-), opera singer
Spyros Vrettos (1960-), poet
John Zavitsanos (1962-), American trial lawyer
Spiros Marangos (1967-), footballer
Marina Lambrini Diamandis (1985-), singer and songwriter

Gallery

See also
Egremni

Notes

Sources

External links
[http://www.lefkadaofficial.com
Official Travel Guide to Lefkada]
Municipal Port Fund of Lefkada Official page
[http://www.lefkadaofficial.com/enjoy-the-island/ Lefkada Official App

Lefkada Prefecture
Travel Guide to Lefkada
The official page of Greek National Tourism Organization
 Map of Homer's Ithaka (Lefkada), Same and Asteris according to Wilhelm Dörpfeld. Digital library of Heidelberg University.
 Photo of Dörpfeld's excavation site at Lefkada near Nydri, early in the 20th century. Digital library of Heidelberg University.
Lafcadio Hearn Historical Center
Hiking trails on Lefkada

 
Islands of the Ionian Islands (region)
Islands of Greece
Municipalities of the Ionian Islands (region)
Corinthian colonies
Septinsular Republic
Landforms of Lefkada (regional unit)
United States of the Ionian Islands
Populated places in Lefkada (regional unit)